Dendrobium brymerianum (Brymer's dendrobium) is a species of orchid. It is native to Yunnan, Assam, and northern Indochina (Myanmar, Thailand, Laos, Vietnam). It grows on tree trunks.

References

External links

brymerianum
Flora of East Himalaya
Flora of Indo-China
Orchids of Assam
Orchids of Yunnan
Plants described in 1875